

First-team squad

Transfers

In:

Out:

Matches

Final standings

Goalscorers
7 Goals
  Gholamreza Rezaei

5 Goals
  Saeed Ramezani

4 Goals
  Siamak Sarlak

3 Goals
  Javad Shirzad
  Bakhtiar Rahmani

2 Goals
  Sajjad Feizollahi
  Nader Ahmadi

1 Goal
  Ayub Vali
  Jaba Mujiri
  Amir Khodamoradi
  Jalal Kameli Mofrad
  Mladen Bartolovic
  Mohammad Alavi
  Arash Afshin

References

Iran Premier League Statistics
Persian League

Foolad F.C. seasons
Foolad